Murex tribulus, the caltrop murex, is a species of large predatory sea snail, a marine gastropod mollusc in the family Muricidae, the rock snails or murex snails.

Description
This quite common snail has a shell with a very long siphonal canal and numerous very long, fragile and acute spines, providing protection against predators. It feeds on other mollusks.

Distribution
This species is widespread from Central Indian Ocean to Western Pacific Ocean.

References

 
 Biolib
 Encyclopaedia of Life
 Diverosa

Gastropods described in 1758
Taxa named by Carl Linnaeus
Murex